The Big Race is a 1934 American film directed by Fred C. Newmeyer.

It was also known as Raising the Wind.

Cast
Boots Mallory as Patricia
John Darrow as Bob Hamilton
Paul Hurst as Skipper O'Nea

References

External links

1934 films
American sports drama films
American black-and-white films
1930s English-language films
Films directed by Fred C. Newmeyer
1930s American films